Ancita lineola is a species of beetle in the family Cerambycidae. It was described by Newman in 1851. It is known from Australia.

References

Ancita
Beetles described in 1851